The 2001–02 British National League season was the sixth season of the British National League, the second level of ice hockey in Great Britain. 12 teams participated in the league, and the Dundee Stars won the championship.

Regular season

Playoffs

Group 1

Group 2

Semifinals 
 Coventry Blaze - Guildford Flames 6:3, 4:1
 Dundee Stars - Fife Flyers 5:2, 5:1

Final 
 Dundee Stars - Coventry Blaze 7:4, 1:3

External links 
 Season on hockeyarchives.info

British National League (1996–2005) seasons
United
2